Cercospora zebrina is a fungal plant pathogen.

References

External links

zebrina
Fungal plant pathogens and diseases